Another Planet is a studio album by the English gothic rock band Alien Sex Fiend. It was released in 1988 by Anagram Records.

Release 
The cassette and CD versions included the bonus track "Satisfaction", a cover of the Rolling Stones song.

The CD was reissued in the UK in 2005.

Reception 

Trouser Press qualified the album as "extremely entertaining". The Chicago Tribune called it "an LP of strange, well-done dance-floor fare that relies as much on biting, astringent guitar and murderous drumming as on synth-generated thumps and thweeps."

Track listing

References

External links 

 

Alien Sex Fiend albums
1990 albums